Zakon sudbine (The Law of Fate) is the seventh studio album by Bosnian pop-folk singer Selma Bajrami. It was released through Grand Production in June 2010.

Background
Bajrami began work on her seventh studio album in 2008. She teamed up with songwriters Miralem Osmić, Marina Tucaković and Dragan Brajović, as well as producer Dejan Abadić.

Singles
The first two singles Đavolica ("She-Devil"), with Bosnian rapper Deda, and "Farmerice" ("Jeans") were released in June and July 2009.

One of the album's singles was the duet "Što je od Boga dobro je" ("What's from God Is Good") with Macedonian singer Elvir Mekić who also co-wrote the lyrics. In March 2010 the song won the "Oskar" for best duet in Banja Luka.

Reality show
A reality show in which Selma searches for dancers to appear in the music video for her single Voli me do bola went into production in 2010 and began airing on Hayat TV in spring of 2011.

Track listing

Personnel

Instruments

Dragan Paunović – accordion (1, 3, 4, 6, 10)
Ivana Selakov – backing vocals (1, 2, 3, 4, 5, 6, 7, 9, 10)
Petar Trumbetaš – bouzouki (1, 3, 4, 6, 9)
Petar Trumbetaš – guitar (1, 2, 3, 4, 5, 6, 9)
Bane Kljajić – guitar (7, 10)
Edin Zulović – keyboards (2, 5, 7, 9)
Dejan Abadić – keyboards (1, 3, 4, 6, 10)
Vuk Zirojević – keyboards (2, 5, 7, 9)
Miloš Nikolić – trumpet (7)

Production and recording

Dejan Abadić – arrangement (1, 3, 4, 6, 10)
Vuk Zirojević – arrangement, programming (2, 5, 7, 9)
Vuk Zirojević – mixing (1, 2, 3, 4, 5, 6, 7, 9, 10)
Đole Petrović – programming (1, 3, 4, 6, 10)

References

2010 albums
Selma Bajrami albums
Grand Production albums